Scissors Cut is the fifth solo studio album by Art Garfunkel released in August 1981 on Columbia Records. It was his second album to miss the US Billboard top 40 (charting at 113) and his second album containing no US top 40 singles. The month following its release, Garfunkel would reunite with former partner, Paul Simon, for their famous 1981 Concert in Central Park.

History
In August 1981, Garfunkel released his fifth solo album Scissors Cut (U.S. No. 113, U.K. No. 51). This album included the Gallagher & Lyle hit "A Heart in New York" (U.S. No. 61). The UK version contains the track "The Romance" rather than "Bright Eyes".  The album was co-produced by Roy Halee, who also co-produced the Simon & Garfunkel albums, including Bridge over Troubled Water. Paul Simon makes a brief appearance on "In Cars" performing background vocals. Near the end of the song, Art sings, rather mystically, lines from "Girl from the North Country". ("Remember me to one who lives there, she once was a true love of mine" which itself comes from "Scarborough Fair" - an old English ballad covered by Simon and Garfunkel on the album Parsley, Sage, Rosemary and Thyme - a lyric extracted from this song.) The album is dedicated to Laurie Bird and includes a partial photograph of her on the rear cover.

Garfunkel was devastated by Bird's death in his New York apartment in June 1979 while he was in Europe filming Bad Timing. Garfunkel was quoted at the time, "Laurie was the greatest thing I ever knew in my life, now I've lost it." In 1988, he added, "I took her death terribly and remained moody over it through much of the 80's." He became somewhat of a recluse following the tragedy and wouldn't release another album until 1986's The Animals' Christmas with Amy Grant.

Track listing

Side One
"A Heart in New York" (Benny Gallagher, Graham Lyle) – 3:13
"Scissors Cut" (Jimmy Webb) – 3:49
"Up in the World" (Clifford T. Ward) – 2:16
"Hang On In" (Norman Sallitt) – 3:46
"So Easy to Begin" (Jules Shear) – 2:56
Side Two
"Bright Eyes" (Mike Batt) – 3:55  (Replaced with "The Romance" on U.K./Japan release)
"Can't Turn My Heart Away" (John Jarvis, Eric Kaz) – 4:22
"The French Waltz" (Adam Mitchell) – 2:12
"In Cars" (Jimmy Webb) – 3:47
"That's All I've Got to Say (Theme from The Last Unicorn)" (Jimmy Webb) – 1:54

Charts

Personnel
 Art Garfunkel – vocals
 Lisa Garber, Leah Kunkel – background vocals
 Tommy Vig – vibraphone, background vocals
 John Jarvis – piano
 Lew Soloff – flugelhorn, trumpet
 David Campbell – strings
 Joe Osborn, Tony Levin, Scott Chambers – bass guitar
 Pete Carr, Dean Parks, Michael Staton, Graham Lyle, Chris Spedding – guitar
 Paul Simon, Andrew Gold – guitar, background vocals
 Teo Macero – conductor
 Roland Harker – lute
 Rick Shlosser, Russ Kunkel, Rick Marotta – drums
 Michael Brecker – tenor saxophone
 Jeffrey Staton – guitar, background vocals
 Ray Cooper – percussion
 Errol "Crusher" Bennett – congas, percussion
 Rob Mounsey, Michael Boddicker – synthesizer
 Del Newman – strings
 Jimmy Webb – piano
 Larry Knechtel – keyboards
 Eugene Orloff – concertmaster

Production
 Roy Halee – producer, engineer
 Art Garfunkel – producer  
 Mike Batt – producer
 Terry Rosiello – mixing
 Greg Calbi – mastering
 John Berg – design
 Anthony Loew – artwork

References

Art Garfunkel albums
1981 albums
Columbia Records albums
Albums produced by Art Garfunkel
Albums produced by Roy Halee
Albums recorded at Wally Heider Studios